Shefali Ghosh ( – December 31, 2006) was a Bangladeshi music artist. She sang Chittagong's regional songs. She was awarded Ekushey Padak by the Government of Bangladesh in 2008.

Early life
Ghosh was born in  Boalkhali Upazila in Chittagong. She was the second eldest among her ten siblings.

Awards

 Independent Bengali Radio Sabdasainika Medal (1990)
 Bengali Academy Lifetime Achievement Award (2002)
 Shilpakala Academy Award (2003) 
 Ekushey Padak (2008)

References

1941 births
2006 deaths
Bangladeshi women musicians
Recipients of the Ekushey Padak
People from Chittagong District
20th-century women musicians